is a former Japanese badminton player. Matsuda graduated from the Kumamoto Chuo High School. The Fujitsu player, competed at the Summer Olympics in Sydney, Australia. Matsuda won the National Championships in the mixed doubles event in 1991 and 1995; and in the women's doubles event in 1996 and 1998.

Achievements

IBF World Grand Prix
The World Badminton Grand Prix sanctioned by International Badminton Federation (IBF) since 1983.

Women's doubles

IBF International
Mixed doubles

References

External links
 
 

1972 births
Living people
Sportspeople from Kumamoto Prefecture
Japanese female badminton players
Olympic badminton players of Japan
Badminton players at the 2000 Summer Olympics
Badminton players at the 1998 Asian Games
Asian Games bronze medalists for Japan
Asian Games medalists in badminton
Medalists at the 1998 Asian Games